Nesluša is a village and municipality in the Kysucké Nové Mesto District in the Zilina Region of northern Slovakia.

Etymology
The name probably comes from Slovak neslušný (rude, naughty, socially unacceptable). It could be also derived from neslušať (not to hear something) - "the hidden village", "the village you hear nothing about". Nezlusa 1367, Neszlusa 1438, Neslussa Walachorum 1598, Neszlussa 1773, Nesluša 1920.

History
In historical records the village was first mentioned in 1367.

Geography
The village has many mineral springs. Nesluša is situated between green hills. The main creek is called Neslušanka. The village is adjacent to the municipalities of Kysucké Nové Mesto, Ochodnica, Zákopčie, Dlhá nad Kysucou, Rudinská and Rudina.

Culture

Žiarinka
Žiarinka is a musical ensemble that was established in 1995. The principal instrument of the ensemble is the mandolin. Children also play the guitar, accordion, keyboards, flute and drums. Their repertory is wide and includes sequences from operas, extravaganzas, waltzes, polkas, movie melodies and marches. To the present they have performed over 200 recitals. Performances were in various national towns, as well as abroad in Germany, Yugoslavia, Poland and the Czech Republic.

Demography
Nesluša has a population of about 3,205 people.

Historical demography

1715 	 - 792 inhabitants
1828	 - 2498 inhabitants
1869	 - 2032 inhabitants
1880	 - 1746 inhabitants
1890	 - 1912 inhabitants
1900	 - 1997 inhabitants
1910	 - 2288 inhabitants
1921	 - 2483 inhabitants
1930	 - 2746 inhabitants
1940	 - 3153 inhabitants
1948	 - 3155 inhabitants
1961	 - 4045 inhabitants
1970	 - 4045 inhabitants
1975	 - 3412 inhabitants
1980	 - 3645 inhabitants
1990	 - 3263 inhabitants
2006    - 3205 inhabitants

Parts of the village

u Adamkov		
u Burďakov		
Červené		
Drndovce
Guckovce		
Halúskovce		
Holovce		
Homoľovce
Chovancovce		
Janáčovce		
Jancovce		
Juríčkovce
Klimkovce
Kozí vŕšok		
Krúpovce
Kutiny		
Na Kavuli		
Na Lane
Na Vyšnej ceste
Na pastovníku
Pri Mlyne	
Na Žrebíkoch		
Parišovce
Paukovce
Platkovce
Puškátka		
Skokanovce		
Sucháňovce		
Štrbavovce
Tabakovce		
Vlkovce

Parts of village in highland

Balošákovce		
Čulákovce		
Grešákovce		
Horná Suchá
U Hutyrov		
U Jurdov		
Kantorovce		
Kubalovce
Liskovce		
U Bielych		
U Haľamov		
Majtánky
Mičekovce		
Ondruškovci		
Ostré			
Petránky
Rapaňovce		
Stredná Suchá		
Šindelná		
Škorvanovce
Tabačkovce		
U Samuhlích

Sport

Hockeyball
Pivní skauti (Beer Scouts) is a hockeyball team playing  in the Nesluša hockeyball league.

Accommodation
Hotel Les
Centrum

Politics
The mayor is Zuzana Jancová.

References

External links
 Village Website (in Slovak)
 Culture and wildlife images

Villages and municipalities in Kysucké Nové Mesto District